Gereon Otto von Gutmann zu Sobernheim (1571 – 25 September 1638) was a Catholic prelate who served as Auxiliary Bishop of Cologne (1616–1638).

Biography
Gereon Otto von Gutmann zu Sobernheim was born in Koblenz, Germany in 1571 and ordained a priest in 1598. On 30 August 1606, he was appointed during the papacy of Pope Paul V as Auxiliary Bishop of Cologne and Titular Bishop of Cyrene. On 9 October 1616, he was consecrated bishop by Antonio Albergati, Bishop of Bisceglie. He served as Auxiliary Bishop of Cologne until his death on 25 September 1638.

While bishop, he was the principal consecrator of Johannes Pelking, Auxiliary Bishop of Paderborn (1620); and the principal co-consecrator of Otto von Senheim, Auxiliary Bishop of Trier (1634).

References

External links and additional sources
 (for Chronology of Bishops) 
 (for Chronology of Bishops)  
 (for Chronology of Bishops) 
 (for Chronology of Bishops)  

16th-century German Roman Catholic bishops
Bishops appointed by Pope Paul V
1571 births
1638 deaths